The Notawasepe Potawatamie Reservation was the home of the principal ancestors of the Nottawaseppi Huron Band of Potawatomi starting in 1821, under a treaty made with the United States government.  The reservation, which was first established in 1821 and significantly expanded in 1827, was disbanded in 1833.

Nottawaseppi Huron Band of Potawatomi
1821 establishments in Michigan Territory
1833 disestablishments
Anishinaabe reservations and tribal-areas in the United States
Native American tribes in Michigan
Former American Indian reservations